Tangkore, alternatively spelled Tengkore, is the capital village and largest settlement on the island of Teraina, Kiribati.

References

Populated places in Kiribati